Karimpana is a 1980 Indian Malayalam film,  directed by I. V. Sasi. The film stars Jayan, Seema, Kaviyoor Ponnamma and Adoor Bhasi in the lead roles. The film has musical score by A. T. Ummer. The film was shot in Ayira, a village near Parassala, Thiruvananthapuram district. The movie was in hit chart.

Cast

Jayan as Muthan
Seema as Kamalam
Kaviyoor Ponnamma Muthan's mother
Adoor Bhasi as Mr. Kenneth (Sayippu)
Manavalan Joseph
Prameela as Mrs. Kenneth (Madamma)
Sankaradi
Cochin Haneefa
Balan K. Nair as Chellayya
KPAC Sunny as Sunny
Kanakadurga
Kottarakkara Sreedharan Nair
Kunchan as Pushpangadan
Kunjandi
Kuthiravattam Pappu as Palayya
Oduvil Unnikrishnan
Kundara Johny
Paravoor Bharathan
Ravi Menon as Vesamani
Reena as Thankamma
Silk Smitha as Palamma

Release
The film was released on 16 October 1980.

Box office
The film was commercial success.

Soundtrack
The music was composed by A. T. Ummer and the lyrics were written by Bichu Thirumala.

References

External links
 

1980 films
1980s Malayalam-language films
Films shot in Thiruvananthapuram
Films directed by I. V. Sasi
Films scored by A. T. Ummer